Danby is an ghost town in San Bernardino County, California, United States. It lies at an elevation of 1,345 ft (410 m). The town was originally founded in 1883 Danby is located along the BNSF Railroad just south of Route 66 on Danby Rd, 9 miles southwest of Essex. As of 2015 this stretch of Route 66 remains closed due to prior flash floods

References
https://www.theroute-66.com/danby.html

Unincorporated communities in San Bernardino County, California
Unincorporated communities in California